Dacha Diner was an Eastern European, Jewish, and Russian restaurant in Seattle's Capitol Hill neighborhood, in the U.S. state of Washington.

Description 
The menu included khachapuri, latkes (potato pancakes), brisket, pelmeni, borscht, matzo ball soup, sandwiches, cider, and wine.

History 
Following a soft opening in late December 2018, the restaurant opened in 2019. It closed in March 2022.

Reception 
Dacha Diner was included in Bon Appetit’s list of 50 Best New Restaurants. In 2019, the business was a finalist in the Restaurant of the Year category in Eater Seattle's annual Eater Awards. The website's Gabe Guarente wrote, "The signature khachapuri — a decadent Georgian bread and cheese dish that’s rare in Seattle — is not to be missed." Guarente also included the restaurant's khachapuri in "10 Seattle Dishes That Became Stars in 2019". Allecia Vermillion included the restaurant in Seattle Metropolitan'''s 2021 list of "The Best Restaurants on Capitol Hill". Jessica Voelker of Condé Nast Traveler'' wrote, "Doughy, rich, and achingly delicious, the food at Dacha Diner will warm you from the inside out."

See also 
 List of defunct restaurants of the United States
 List of Russian restaurants

References 

2018 establishments in Washington (state)
2022 disestablishments in Washington (state)
Capitol Hill, Seattle
Defunct European restaurants in Seattle
Jewish American culture
Jewish restaurants
Jews and Judaism in Seattle
Restaurants disestablished in 2022
Restaurants established in 2018
Russian restaurants in the United States
Russian-American culture